Acetergamine is an organic chemical compound; specifically it is a derivative of ergoline, making it a member of the ergotamine family of compounds. Acetergamine currently has no mainstream uses, however its potential as an alpha-1 blocker and vasodilator has led to it being covered in several patents concerning therapies for erectile dysfunction. It has also been investigated as a treatment for cerebellar ataxia.

References

Alpha-1 blockers
Abandoned drugs
Ergolines
Indole alkaloids
Acetamides